Tennis at the 2011 Island Games was held from 26 June–1 July 2011 at the Ryde Lawn Tennis Club and Ryde Mead Tennis Club.

Medal summary

Medal table

Medal events

References
Tennis at the 2011 Island Games

 
Island Games
Tennis
2011